Major Eugène Van Dievoet (9 May 186220 March 1937), was a Belgian architect and Major of military engineering. He mainly designed Art Deco and Beaux-Arts in Brussels.

Biography 
Eugène Van Dievoet is the son of Ernest Jean-Louis Van Dievoet (Brussels, 16 July 1835 - Saint-Gilles, 28 August 1903) and Léonie Joséphine Françoise Most (Antwerp, 14 July 1838 - Brussels 1943), daughter of Ferdinand Gustave Adolphe Most and Ghislaine Philippine Pauline Delsart; and the grandson of Eugène Van Dievoet and Hortense Poelaert, sister of the famous architect Joseph Poelaert. He is therefore the first cousin of the architect Henri Van Dievoet and the Art Nouveau decorator Gabriel Van Dievoet.

He married Léonie Caroline Catherine Quarez, born in Liège on 22 May 1865 and died in Woluwe-Saint-Lambert, rue Vergote 30, on 6 December 1944, daughter of Philippe Guillaume Quarez and Catherine Lambertine Marie Ogis. They did not have children.

Career 
Eugène Van Dievoet began his career as a military architect and trained at the Royal Military Academy (48th class, engineering, 1880–1885).

He was Major of military engineering, engineer, professor at the Royal Military Academy and member of the Royal Society of Archeology of Brussels since 1936.

After his military activities, he became a civil architect (living in rue Vergote 30) and built many houses and apartment buildings in Art Deco style or Beaux-Arts in Brussels.

Works 

 1922 : Schaerbeek : House of Monsieur Louis Brison, stockbroker, boulevard Reyers, 120, Bourgeois house in bricks and stone, Louis XV style.
 1923 : Brussels, rue des Fabriques, n° 32, Bourgeois house in Beaux-Arts style.
 1923 : Brussels, rue des Fabriques n° 32A to 36A, 5-story appartient building in Art Deco style.
 1923 : Woluwe-Saint-Lambert : rue Vergote 30 (previously n° 14 in Schaerbeek), personal home of the architecte, Bourgeois house in eclectic style and of Beaux-Arts inspiration.

Honours 

 Officer of the Order of the Crown
 Knight of the Order of Léopold (Military Division)
  Military Cross (First Class)
 Commemorative Medal of the reign of HM Léopold II

Bibliography 

 1935: Histoire de l'École militaire, 1834-1934, Brussels, printer Marcel Hayez, 1935, p. 361.
 1936: Bulletin de la Société Royale d'Archéologie de Bruxelles, 2 March 1936.
 1993: Le patrimoine monumental de la Belgique, Brussels, Pentagone E-M, Brussels, Pierre Mardaga, editor, 1993, volume 1B, p. 41.
 2003: Anne Van Loo (dir.), Dictionnaire de l'Architecture en Belgique de 1830 à nos jours, Antwerp, Fonds Mercator, 2003, p. 561.

References 

Eugene
Eugene
Eugene
Belgian military engineers
20th-century Belgian military personnel
Recipients of Belgian military awards and decorations
Order of Leopold (Belgium)